Ten Percent is the debut studio album recorded by American male vocal quartet Double Exposure, released in 1976 on the Salsoul label.

History
The album features the title track, which peaked at No.2 on the Hot Dance Club Play chart, No. 54 on the Billboard Hot 100 and No. 63 on the Hot Soul Singles chart. Also featured are two other chart singles: "My Love Is Free" and "Everyman (Has to Carry His Own Weight)". The album was remastered and reissued with bonus tracks in 2012 by Big Break Records.

Track listing

Personnel
Leonard "Butch" Davis, Charles Whittington, Joseph Harris, James Williams – vocals
Earl Young – drums
Ron Baker – bass
Vincent Montana, Jr. – vibes
Larry Washington – congas 
Norman Harris, Bobby Eli, T.J. Tindall – guitars
Carlton Kent, Ron Kersey, Bunny Sigler, T.G. Conway, Bruce Hawes – keyboards
Robert Hartzell, Rocco Bene – trumpets
Robert Moore, Edward Cascarella, Richard Genovese, Frederick Joiner – trombones
Jeffery Kirschen, Milton Phibbs – French horns
John Wilson – flugelhorn
Don Renaldo (Christine Reeves, Americus Mungiole, Rudolph Malizia, Lance Elbeck, Charles Apollonia, Richard Jones) – violins
Anthony Sinagoga, Davis Barnett, Peter Nocella – violas
Romeo Di Stefano, Larry Gold, Patricia Weimer – cellos
Bunny Harris – tambourine
Barbara Ingram, Evette Benton, Carla Benson – background vocals

Production
Norman Harris, Bruce Hawes, Ron Baker, Earl Young, Vincent Montana, Jr. – producers
Joe Cayre, Stan Cayre, Ken Cayre – executive producers
Carl Paruolo, Arthur Stoppe, Jim Gallagher, Kenny Present, Jeff Stewart, Peter Humphreys, Dirk Devlin – engineers
Walter Gibbons, Ken Cayre – mixing
Al Brown  mastering
Allan Tannenbaum – cover photography
Hank Dunning – backline photography
Karen Bernath – design
Paula Bisacca – art direction

Charts

Singles

References

External links
 

1976 debut albums
Double Exposure (band) albums
Albums produced by Norman Harris
Albums recorded at Sigma Sound Studios
Salsoul Records albums